Mihtarlam District is located in the center of Laghman Province and consists of the urban centre and provincial capital Mihtarlam and 24 major villages and 269 sub-villages.

Etymology 
Mihtarlam derives its name from Mihtarlam Baba (Lamech), who was reputed to be the father of the prophet Noah.

Geography 

It borders with Kabul Province to the west, Alishing and Alingar districts to the north and Qarghayi District to the east and south.

Demographics 

The district's population is 121,200 (as of 2006) - 60% Pashtun, 35% Tajik and 5% Pashai. The city of Mehterlam has a population of 32,949. It has 10 districts and a total land area of 1,397 hectares. The total number of dwellings in this city is 3,661.

Land use
The Alishang river pours into Alingar River just south of the district center, and the lands around them are irrigated. Agriculture is the main source of income. Many young men search for work in Iran and Pakistan. About 59% of the houses were partially or fully destroyed during the wars. Many people fled, but now they are returning.

Mihtarlam is located in eastern Afghanistan 40 km from Jalalabad and between two rivers: Alishang and Alingar. It is almost equally divided between built-up	land (51%) and non built-up land (49%). Residential land is largely clustered in Districts 1–3. District 1 is also home to a large commercial and institutional area (50 ha).

References

External links
AIMS district map
2003 AIMS district profile

Districts of Laghman Province